This is a list of years in Belgian television.

Twenty-first century

Twentieth century

See also 
 List of years in Belgium
 Lists of Belgian films
 List of years in television

Television
Television in Belgium by year
Belgian television